Ghalib ki Haveli ( ALA-LC:   lit. "Ghalib's Mansion") was the residence of the 19th century Urdu poet Mirza Ghalib and is now a heritage site  located in the Gali Qasim Jan, Ballimaran, Old Delhi and reflects the period when the Mughal era was on the decline in India.

The house was given to him by Hakim, a physician who is believed was an enthusiast of his poetry. After the poet's death in 1869, Hakim used to sit there every evening, not allowing anyone enter the building.

About

Mirza Ghalib's Haveli is located in the Old Delhi and is a heritage site declared by Archaeological Survey of India. It offers an insight into the Mirza Ghalib's lifestyle and architecture of the Mughal Era. The large compound of the Haveli with columns and bricks are the reminiscence of the Mughal Empire in Delhi. The walls are adorned with the huge portrait of the poet and his couplets which are hung around the side walls. After the takeover by the Delhi government the haveli was made into a permanent memorial museum housing objects related to the poet and his times. It also houses various hand written poems by the poet besides his books. The museum also houses a life size replica of the poet in a realistic setting with a hookah in his hand. Portraits of Ustaad Zauq, Abu Zafar, Momin, and other noted contemporaries of Ghalib can also be seen.
On 27 December 2010, former Delhi Chief Minister Sheila Dikshit unveiled a sculpture of the poet that was sculpted by a well known artist Bhagwan Rampure and commissioned by poet and Hindi film lyricist Gulzar. A portrait of Ghalib commissioned by the former president of India Dr. Zakir Hussain served as the blue print for the sculpture.

History

Ghalib lived in this Haveli for a long period of his life after he came from Agra. While staying at this Haveli, he wrote his Urdu and Persian ‘diwans’. Many a year after Ghalib's death the place housed shops inside it until the year of 1999 after which the government acquired a portion of it and renovated it. It was given a special touch with the use of Mughal Lakhori bricks, sandstone & a wooden entrance gate to recreate the 19th century period.

Architecture
It is built using traditional material including lakhori bricks and lime mortar.

Information
Located near Chawri Bazar metro station and Delhi Junction railway station it is open to all, with free entry and no photography charges, from 11 am till 6 pm on all days except Monday.

Gallery

See also

Ghalib Museum, New Delhi
Ghalib Academy, New Delhi
 Chandni Chowk
 Chunnamal Haveli
 Dharampura Haveli
 Nangal Sirohi havelis of NCR

References

Museums established in 1969
Museums in Delhi
Biographical museums in India
Havelis
Houses in Delhi
Ghalib